Four Field Kono is an abstract strategy game from Korea. Each player attempts to capture the other player's pieces by jumping over their own piece and landing on the other player's piece. The game is not related or similar to another Korean game called Five Field Kono.

Although the game is often described as being medieval, this assertion does not seem to be backed by evidence. It has, however, been recorded being played from the late 19th century onwards.

Goal
The goal of each player is to capture the other player's pieces and reduce it to one. This is because with only one piece, a player can no longer execute a capture. Another way to win is for a player to immobilize the other player's pieces so that they cannot move or capture.

Equipment
The board is a 4×4 marble hole board. There are 16 marbles total of which 8 are black and 8 are white.

Gameplay
The game is played according to these rules.

 Players decide what color marbles to play, and who goes first.
 The board is completely filled with the 16 marbles in the beginning. Each player's marbles are set up on their half of the board.
 Since the board is filled up in the beginning and hence no vacant holes, the first move by the first player will be a capturing move.A capturing move requires a player's marble to jump over one of his own adjacent marbles orthogonally (not diagonally), and to land onto an enemy marble which is then removed from the board and replaced with the player's marble. Only one marble can be used to capture or move per turn. Multiple captures are not allowed. Once a marble has captured one enemy marble, the turn is completed. Captures are not compulsory.
 A marble can move orthogonally (not diagonally) one space per turn onto a vacant hole.
 Players alternate their turns throughout the game.

References

External links
 

19th-century board games
Abstract strategy games
Traditional board games
Korean games